Union Chapel may refer to:

United Kingdom
 Union Chapel, Brighton
 Union Chapel, Islington

United States
National Register of Historical Places
(by state, then city/town)
Pine Orchard Union Chapel, Branford, Connecticut, listed on the National Register of Historic Places (NRHP) in New Haven County
East Raymond Union Chapel, East Raymond, Maine, listed on the NRHP in Cumberland County
Union Chapel (Glenwood, Maryland), listed on the NRHP in Howard County
Union Chapel (Oak Bluffs, Massachusetts), listed on the NRHP in Dukes County
Union Chapel (Hillsborough, New Hampshire), listed on the NRHP in Hillsborough County
Union Chapel (North Hampton, New Hampshire)
Union Chapel (Cornwall-on-Hudson, New York), listed on the NRHP in Orange County
Ponckhockie Union Chapel, Kingston, New York, listed on the NRHP in Ulster County
Union Chapel (Shelter Island Heights, New York), listed on the NRHP in Suffolk County
Union Chapel (Windham, New York), listed on the NRHP in Greene County
Beaver Meadow Union Chapel, Norwich, Vermont, listed on the NRHP in Windsor County

Places
Union Chapel, Alabama
Union Chapel, Massachusetts

See also
 Union Church (disambiguation)